Eli most commonly refers to:
 Eli (name), a given name, nickname and surname
 Eli (biblical figure)

Eli or ELI may also refer to:

Film
 Eli (2015 film), a Tamil film
 Eli (2019 film), an American horror film

Music
 Eli (Jan Akkerman album) (1976)
 Eli (Supernaut album) (2006)

Places
 Alni, Ardabil Province, Iran, also known as Elī
 Eli, Mateh Binyamin, an Israeli settlement in the West Bank
 Éile or Éli, a medieval kingdom in Ireland
 Eli, Kentucky, United States
 Eli, Nebraska, United States
 Eli, West Virginia, United States

Other uses
 Eli (opera), an opera by Walter Steffens
 ELI (programming language)
 Earth Learning Idea
 English language institute
 Environmental Law Institute, an American environmental law policy organization
 European Law Institute
 European Legislation Identifier
 Extreme Light Infrastructure, a proposed high energy laser research facility of the European Union
 Eli, someone from Yale University, after Elihu Yale

See also
 Eli, Eli (disambiguation)
 Elie (disambiguation)
 Ely (disambiguation)